José Adriano Pequito Rebelo (born 21 May 1892 in Gavião, Portugal – died 22 January 1983 in Lisbon) was a Portuguese writer, politician and aviator.

Early life
Born into a monarchist family, Pequito Rebelo studied law at University of Coimbra where he followed in the family's political footsteps. He followed his family into exile in the early 1910s to Paris and whilst there became converted to the Action Française school of monarchism.

Integralismo
On his return to Portugal in 1914 he became a founder of Integralismo Lusitano along with José Hipólito Raposo, Alberto Monsaraz and António Sardinha. Uniquely amongst this leadership Pequito Rebelo enlisted in the Portuguese Expeditionary Corps during the First World War, whilst also writing extensively for the integralist journals, often on the theme of his hatred for urbanism.

Pequito Rebelo was involved in the monarchist uprising of 1919 and suffered serious wounds in the fighting. However, when brought to trial for his involvement he was surprisingly exonerated.

New ideals
Pequito Rebelo's ideas appeared to radicalise with age as he came under the influence of Georges Valois and took to writing for the syndicalist paper Politico. He looked set for a switch to the National Syndicalists but again changed his mind and became a loyalist for António de Oliveira Salazar. The two enjoyed a fairly cordial personal relationship and in 1932 Pequito Rebelo advised Salazar to abandon the Portuguese constitution and establish a new order in the country. They remained in regular correspondence throughout the 1930s.

Adventurism
Left somewhat restless by his support for the government Pequito Rebelo volunteered as an aviator in the Spanish Civil War on the side of Francisco Franco. In later years he became a leading advocate of colonialism and in 1961, despite his advancing years, volunteered for pilot duties against pro-independence guerrillas in Portuguese Angola.

He continued writing until his death in 1983.

References

1892 births
1983 deaths
People from Gavião, Portugal
Integralismo Lusitano
Portuguese monarchists
Portuguese aviators
Portuguese politicians
Portuguese soldiers
Portuguese male writers
Portuguese military personnel of World War I
Portuguese people of the Spanish Civil War
University of Coimbra alumni
Foreign volunteers in the Spanish Civil War